Bamsemums (bearchu) is a bear shaped chocolate-covered marshmallow candy created by the chocolate factory  Bouquet d'Or, in Ascq, France.

History 

The first bear shaped chocolate-covered marshmallow candy was invented and manufactured in 1962 by the chocolate factory Bouquet d'Or, in Ascq (now Villeneuve-d'Ascq), France under the name 'Petit ourson'.

Some confectionaries have started to make their own bear shaped chocolate-covered marshmallow candy as the Bouquet d'Or's one, as Nidar in 1975.

Types of Bamsemums
Bamsemums original (1975)
Bamsemums jelly (1992)
Bamsemums foam (1992)
Bamsemums banana (2004)
Bamsemums raspberry (2005)
Bamsemums citrus (2014)

References

External links
 Bamsemums official website 

Brand name confectionery
Marshmallows
Norwegian brands
Orkla ASA